Imerio Massignan (born 2 January 1937) is an Italian former professional road cyclist. A pure climber, he debuted as professional in the 1959 Giro d'Italia, classifying 5th overall. This was followed by a series of good placements in the subsequent editions, including a 2nd overall in the 1962 Giro behind Franco Balmamion.

At the Tour de France he won the Mountains classification in 1960 and 1961, when he also finished 4th overall. In the latter season he also obtained a second place in the Giro di Lombardia.

Massignan retired in 1969.

Major results

1959
Giro d'Italia:
5th place overall classification
1960
Tour de France:
Winner Mountains classification
10th place overall classification
Giro d'Italia:
4th place overall classification
1961
Tour de France:
Winner Mountains classification
Winner stage 16
4th place overall classification
Giro di Lombardia
2nd behind Vito Taccone
1962
Tour de France:
7th place overall classification
Giro d'Italia:
2nd place overall classification
Lavis
1963
Giro d'Italia:
7th place overall classification
1965
Giro d'Italia:
9th place overall classification

External links 

Italian male cyclists
Cyclists from the Province of Vicenza
Italian Tour de France stage winners
1937 births
Living people